The Church of San Francisco (Spanish, Iglesia de San Francisco), located on one side of the Plaza de Armas of Castro, Chile, is the main Catholic church of Chiloé’s capital. It has a surface area of 1,404 m2, a width of 52m and a height of 27m. The dome above the church's presbytery is 32m high and the height of its towers is 42m. The church is also known as the Iglesia Apóstol Santiago (St James Church) and erroneously as the “cathedral”, which is actually to be found in Ancud, headquarters of the diocese of the same name. The Church of San Francisco does however lead one of the 24 parishes that form this diocese.

The church was declared a Chilean National Monument in 1979 and UNESCO World Heritage Site on 30 November 2000.

History
Castro is Chile's third oldest city in continued existence.  It was founded in February, 1567 by Martín Ruiz de Gamboa, who was sent by his father-in-law, temporary governor of Chile Rodrigo de Quiroga, to establish a city on the Chiloé Archipelago called Santiago de Castro. That same year, a church was built with the name of the apostle Saint James (Santiago in Spanish), which was to be used in the evangelization of the indigenous peoples of Chiloé. The church was burnt down and rebuilt a number of times until its definitive reconstruction in 1771, and used thereafter as a parish administered by the Jesuits.

The church's construction was overseen by the priest Fray Ángel Custodio Subiabre Oyarzún, in charge of the church from 1910 to 1912.

Architecture
The church’s design is the work of Italian architect Eduardo Provasoli, and rather than the typical style of the other churches of Chiloé, the Church of San Francisco's style is Neo-Gothic. The church was built by carpenters from Chiloé under supervision from Salvador Sierpe.

In the structures, the carpenters used wood from the area such as the alerce, cypress, coigüe and other native wood. The interiors are made of Rauli Beech and olivillo; however the facade, roof and exterior lining are sheets of galvanized iron.

Inside the church is an image of the Archangel Michael victorious over Satan, an image of Saint Alberto Hurtado and a replica of the image of Jesus found in the Church of Caguach in Quinchao, Chiloé.

Its facade is often painted with bright colours, making it a highlight of Castro’s Plaza de Armas.

Gallery

References 

Wooden churches in Chile
World Heritage Sites in Chile
18th-century Roman Catholic church buildings in Chile
Colonial architecture in Chile
Roman Catholic churches completed in 1771
Roman Catholic churches completed in 1912
Churches in Chiloé Archipelago
Rebuilt buildings and structures in Chile